Tribunal Constitucional may refer to:

 Constitutional Court, special court defined by the Portuguese Constitution
 Tribunal Constitucional de Espana, the supreme interpreter of the Spanish Constitution
 Tribunal Constitucional del Ecuador, the highest court in Ecuador